A Mother's Rage (also entitled Road Trip) is a 2013 television film directed by Oren Kaplan and starring Lori Loughlin, Kristen Dalton and Ted McGinley. The story starts with Rebecca Mayer and her daughter Conner, who is about to start her first day in college, being chased by a carjacker on the road. After they call the police, Emily Tobin, a local officer, begins to investigate the case.

Cast
Lori Loughlin as Rebecca Mayer
Kristen Dalton as Emily Tobin
Jordan Hinson as Conner Mayer
Alix Elizabeth Gitter as Molly Tobin
Shaun Sipos as Calvin
Christopher Backus as Kelly
Ted McGinley as Stan

References

External links

2013 television films
2013 films